Teju Lal Chaudhary is a Nepalese Politician, former state youth & sports minister and serving as the Member of House Of Representatives (Nepal) elected from Saptari-4, Province No. 2. He is member of the Nepali Congress.

References

Living people
Nepal MPs 2017–2022
Nepali Congress politicians from Madhesh Province
Members of the 2nd Nepalese Constituent Assembly
1962 births
Nepal MPs 2022–present